Scoparia indica is a moth in the family Crambidae. It was described by Patrice J.A. Leraut in 1986. It is found in Uttar Pradesh, India.

References

Moths described in 1986
Scorparia